Basra is a 2008 Egyptian film.

Synopsis 
Cairo, March 17, 2003. The US-UK strike against Iraq is imminent. How can an Egyptian photographer, in his thirties, surpass his own disappointments and fears? How can he find an answer to the existential questions pertaining to life, death, sex and logic amidst his awareness of all the absurdity around him? Can this artist remain alive (breathing, thinking, and photographing) and survive this oppressive atmosphere? Or is he going to fall with Baghdad?

Prizes 
 Mostra de Valencia 2008
 El Cairo 2008
 Cine Árabe, Róterdam, 2009
 Cine Árabe, Bruselas, 2009

References

External links 

 

2008 films
Egyptian drama films